Attila Valter (born 12 June 1998 in Csömör) is a Hungarian cyclist who currently rides for UCI WorldTeam . At the 2019 Tour de l'Avenir he won the ninth stage to Tignes. For the 2020 season Valter turned professional for the senior . That year he won the Tour of Hungary, having finished third in the general classification the previous year. Valter was the first Hungarian winner of the race since 2005. In October 2020, he was named in the startlist for the 2020 Giro d'Italia, making his Grand Tour debut. Valter joined  for the 2021 season. At the 2021 Giro d'Italia, he took the overall lead after the sixth stage to San Giacomo, becoming the first Hungarian rider to wear the pink jersey.

Major results

2015
 1st  National Junior XC MTB Championships
2016
 1st  National Junior XC MTB Championships
2017
 3rd National XC MTB Championships
 9th Overall Tour of Szeklerland
2018
 National Under-23 Road Championships
1st  Road race
1st  Time trial
 9th Road race, UEC European Under-23 Road Championships
2019
 National Road Championships
1st  Time trial
3rd Road race
 1st Grand Prix Cycliste de Gemenc I
 1st Stage 9 Tour de l'Avenir
 2nd Overall Istrian Spring Trophy
1st Stage 1
 2nd Overall Bałtyk–Karkonosze Tour
1st  Young rider classification
 2nd Grand Prix Cycliste de Gemenc II
 3rd Overall Belgrade Banjaluka
1st  Young rider classification
 3rd Overall Tour de Hongrie
 3rd Overall Tour of Antalya
 4th Piccolo Giro di Lombardia
 5th Overall Tour Alsace
 7th Overall Carpathian Couriers Race
 7th Overall Tour of Romania
 8th Overall CCC Tour - Grody Piastowskie
 10th Overall Sibiu Cycling Tour
2020
 1st  Overall Tour de Hongrie
1st  Mountains classification
1st  Hungarian rider classification
1st Stage 5
 2nd Time trial, National Road Championships
 10th Overall Tour des Alpes-Maritimes et du Var
1st  Young rider classification
 10th Gran Piemonte
2021
 2nd Time trial, National Road Championships
 Giro d'Italia
Held  after Stages 6–8
Held  after Stages 4–8
2022
 1st  Road race, National Road Championships
 4th Strade Bianche
 5th Overall Tour of the Alps
 10th Mont Ventoux Dénivelé Challenge
2023
 4th Overall O Gran Camiño
 5th Strade Bianche

Grand Tour general classification results timeline

Classics results timeline

Major championships timeline

References

External links

1998 births
Living people
Hungarian male cyclists
Sportspeople from Pest County
Olympic cyclists of Hungary
Cyclists at the 2020 Summer Olympics